Djelaludin Sharityar is an Afghan footballer defender and was the captain of the Afghanistan national football team.

His career started in 1998 in Germany when as a youth he played for VfL Wolfsburg, he then joined Swiss club FC Kreuzlingen in 2001, then moved back to Germany in 2003 when he joined FC Konstanz, and then FC Emmendingen in 2006, SpVgg Weiden in 2007 and 2008, 1. FC Schweinfurt 05 in 2009, and then in Cyprus, APEP Pitsilia in 2009. Until 2013 he played for Hidd SCC in Bahrain. In 2014, he returned to play for 1. FC Schweinfurt 05 again. In 2015 Sharityar signed a contract with Manama Club (Bahrain Premier League). Manama Club is one of the best teams in Bahrain and will take part in the GCC Champions League (Gulf Cup for Clubs) this season.

Club career stats
Last update: 22 April 2014

References

External links
 

apertura-sports.com

Living people
1983 births
People from Paktika Province
Association football midfielders
Afghan footballers
Afghanistan international footballers
1. FC Schweinfurt 05 players
APEP FC players
Ethnikos Achna FC players
Cypriot First Division players
Afghan expatriate footballers
Expatriate footballers in Cyprus
Expatriate footballers in Bahrain
Expatriate footballers in Germany
Footballers at the 2014 Asian Games
FC Emmendingen players
FC Kreuzlingen players
Sportspeople from Zadran
Asian Games competitors for Afghanistan